Luke Aaron Daley (born 10 November 1989) is an English former professional footballer who played as a winger. He previously played for Norwich City, Stevenage, Plymouth Argyle, Lincoln City, Braintree Town, Dartford and  Chelmsford City.

Career

Norwich City
Daley, who lived in Cley next the Sea, was signed to Norwich after being spotted playing football for local team, Mulbarton Wanderers. After scoring four goals in six reserve team games, Daley was named as a substitute versus Stoke City in March 2008, as an 18-year-old "second-year Academy scholar". Aged 18, he was given a squad number of 39.

In November 2008, Daley came to further attention, when scoring a hat trick in a 4–2 Reserves win against an Arsenal Reserves team that "featured seven players from the squad that beat Wigan Athletic in the League Cup" a week earlier.

Daley made his professional debut for Norwich in a 1–1 draw against Burnley at Carrow Road on 21 February 2009 as a 78th-minute substitute for Jamie Cureton. He made two further substitute appearances towards the latter stages of the 2008–09 season, as Norwich were relegated to League One. The following season, Daley made his first starting appearance for Norwich, playing the whole game in the club's 4–1 home defeat to Sunderland in the League Cup. He made a total of ten appearances for Norwich in all competitions during the 2009–10 season, as the club were promoted back to the Championship.

In January 2011, Daley joined League Two side Stevenage on a one-month loan deal. Stevenage manager Graham Westley had previously tried to bring in Daley ahead of the 2010–11 season, but a thigh injury which had kept Daley out for a large part of the season meant any hopes of signing the player were scuppered. Daley made his debut for Stevenage on 22 January 2011, coming on as a 64th-minute substitute in Stevenage's 2–0 victory against Morecambe. It was to be Daley's only appearance during the first three weeks of his loan spell, appearing as an unused substitute in games against Accrington Stanley and Gillingham. He scored twice for Stevenage's reserve side in a 2–2 draw against Colchester United's second string on 9 February 2011. Daley made two appearances during his one-month loan spell at Stevenage, before returning to his parent club on 22 February.

Plymouth Argyle
Ahead of the 2011–12 season, Daley went on trial with League Two side Plymouth Argyle. He signed for Plymouth Argyle on a permanent basis on 19 July 2011. On 6 August 2011, Daley made his debut for the club in a 1–1 draw against Shrewsbury Town. On 30 August 2011, Daley scored his first goal in senior football with a long-range effort against Exeter City in the Football League Trophy. On 18 February 2012, Daley scored his first league goal in a 4–0 win over Accrington Stanley.
At the end of the 2011–12 season, Daley was released after not being offered a new contract.

Lincoln City
Daley joined Grimsby Town on trial on 3 August 2012 and appeared in the club's final pre-season friendly against Stalybridge Celtic. He joined Lincoln City on a non-contract basis on 10 August, and made his debut the next day in a 1–0 win against Kidderminster Harriers.

Chelmsford City
In August 2015, Daley joined National League South side Chelmsford City after a successful trial. In January 2018, Chelmsford manager Rod Stringer confirmed Daley had left the club and retired from football.

Career statistics

References

External links

1989 births
Living people
Footballers from Northampton
English footballers
Association football wingers
Norwich City F.C. players
Stevenage F.C. players
Plymouth Argyle F.C. players
Lincoln City F.C. players
Braintree Town F.C. players
Dartford F.C. players
English Football League players
National League (English football) players
Chelmsford City F.C. players
People from Cley next the Sea